Pierre Godin (born April 14, 1947) is Canadian former politician. He served in the Legislative Assembly of New Brunswick from 1978 to 1991 as a Liberal member from the constituency of Nigadoo-Chaleur.

References

1947 births
Living people